Gareth Crwys-Williams OBE (27 December 1907 – 8 March 1970) was a Welsh cricketer and a HM Inspector of Schools.

Crwys-Williams was born at Crickhowell in March 1907. He studied at Downing College, Cambridge, where he played for the college cricket team. However, he never played for the Cambridge University Cricket Club. He first played minor counties cricket for Monmouthshire in 1932 against Dorset, playing a further Minor Counties Championship match the following year. He made his only appearance in first-class cricket for the Marylebone Cricket Club in 1934 against Ireland at College Park, Dublin. He later played minor counties cricket for Lincolnshire from 1950–1951. He worked as an HM Inspector of Schools, for which he received an OBE for services to in 1969. He died at Llangollen, Denbighshire, in March 1970.

References

External links
Gareth Crwys-Williams at ESPNcricinfo
Gareth Crwys-Williams at CricketArchive

1907 births
1970 deaths
People from Crickhowell
Sportspeople from Powys
Alumni of Downing College, Cambridge
Welsh cricketers
Monmouthshire cricketers
Marylebone Cricket Club cricketers
Lincolnshire cricketers
British civil servants
Members of the Order of the British Empire